National Treasure: Edge of History is an American action-adventure television series developed for and globally released on the streaming service Disney+. It is based on, and a continuation of, the National Treasure film series. It was produced by  Jerry Bruckheimer and ABC Signature. The series stars Lisette Olivera, with Catherine Zeta-Jones as the apparent lead antagonist, and with Justin Bartha reprising his roles from the films as a recurring character, while Harvey Keitel appears in the beginning, also reprising his film role. Mira Nair directed the pilot episode. The show primarily filmed in Baton Rouge, Louisiana, and Santa Fe, New Mexico, and premiered on December 14, 2022. Among the ten most-streamed programs in the US from its first week, it reached the top 5 in its later weeks.

Cast

Main

 Lisette Olivera as Jess Valenzuela, a young DACA woman living in Baton Rouge who finds out that her dead father is part of a secret network of treasure protectors; later Liam's love interest.
 Zuri Reed as Tasha Rivers, Jess' roommate and best friend.
 Antonio Cipriano as Oren Bradley, another friend, roommate of Ethan, and sneakerhead; Tasha's on-and-off boyfriend
 Jordan Rodrigues as Ethan Chao, Jess' oldest friend who has feelings for her; Oren's roommate
 Jake Austin Walker as Liam Sadusky, musician and bar worker, Peter Sadusky's grandson; later Jess's love interest
 Catherine Zeta-Jones as Billie Pearce, a wealthy and ruthless black market antiquities dealer
 Lyndon Smith as Agent Ross, an FBI agent who recently transferred to the Bureau's Baton Rouge field office. It is later revealed her full name is Hannah Betsy Ross.

Special guest stars
 Harvey Keitel as Peter Sadusky, a reclusive former FBI agent and master Freemason suffering from dementia. Keitel played the same character in both films.
 Justin Bartha as Riley Poole, computer expert and good friend of Ben Gates from the National Treasure film series

Recurring

 Breeda Wool as Kacey, one of Billie's mercenaries
 Dustin Ingram as Myles, Peter's former nurse
 Salena Qureshi as Meena Mishra, Ethan's love interest
 Darri Ingolfsson as Dario, another one of Billie's mercenaries
 Armando Riesco as Agent Hendricks, Agent Ross's boss and Peter Sadusky's former partner and friend. Riesco reprises his role from the film series.
 Tommy Savas as Dr. Zeke Hudson, a coroner at the city morgue who is interested in Agent Ross romantically
 Joseph D. Reitman as The Bearded Man, a man who follows Jess and her friends
 Jacob Vargas as Rafael, Jess' father

Episodes

Production

Development
In early May 2020, Jerry Bruckheimer revealed in an interview with Collider that a National Treasure television series was in the works for Disney+. The series would follow the same concept as the films with a younger cast. The script for the pilot was completed, with plotting for the story continued for the rest of the episodes.
In March 2021, Disney officially greenlit the series. The series's title was revealed in July 2022, ahead of its panel at San Diego Comic-Con.

Casting
In October 2021, Lisette Olivera, a Latina actress from LA previously acting under the name Lisette Alexís, was cast in the lead role. In January 2022, Zuri Reed, Jake Austin Walker, Antonio Cipriano, Jordan Rodrigues and Lyndon Smith were added to the cast, with Catherine Zeta-Jones joining the next month. In April 2022, Justin Bartha joined the series as a recurring guest star to reprise his role from the films. On July 21, 2022, during San Diego Comic-Con, it was revealed that Harvey Keitel would also be reprising his role, as Peter Sadusky, the lead FBI agent from the first 2 movies.

Filming
Principal photography began on February 12, 2022, in Baton Rouge. Filming moved to Santa Fe, New Mexico in late June.

Music

Release
National Treasure: Edge of History was released on December 14, 2022, on Disney+, with its first two episodes available immediately.

Reception

Audience viewership 
According to Whip Media's TV Time, National Treasure: Edge of History was the 10th most streamed television series across all platforms in the United States, during the week of December 18, 2022. the 9th during the week of December 25, 2022, the 10th during the week of January 1, 2023, the 10th during the week of January 8, 2023, the 7th during the week of January 15, 2023, the 4th during the week of January 22, 2023, the 5th during the week of January 29, 2023, the 5th during the week of February 5, 2023, and the 7th during the week of February 12th, 2023.

Critical response 
The review aggregator website Rotten Tomatoes reported an approval rating of 38% based on 21 critic reviews, with an average rating of 5.5/10. The website's critics consensus reads, "Treating the franchise's past with an overweening reverence while padding out its new cast with cloying sidekicks, this National Treasure spinoff tumbles over the edge of satisfaction." Metacritic, which uses a weighted average, assigned a score of 46 out of 100 based on 10 critics, indicating "mixed or average reviews". An early review of the completed series by Grant Marek, the editor-in-chief of SFGate, described it as "great" and "really fun watch", referring positively to connections to the films.

References

External links
 
 

2020s American drama television series
2022 American television series debuts
American action adventure television series
Cultural depictions of Elvis Presley
Cultural depictions of Meriwether Lewis and William Clark
Disney+ original programming
English-language television shows
Live action television shows based on films
Mesoamerica in fiction
National Treasure (film series)
Television series about the Federal Bureau of Investigation
Television series by ABC Signature Studios
Television shows filmed in Louisiana
Television shows filmed in New Mexico
Television shows set in Louisiana
Television shows set in Mexico
Television shows set in Mississippi
Television shows set in San Antonio
Television shows set in Tennessee
Treasure hunt television series